John Sellers is an American politician. He serves as a Republican member for the Grafton 18th district of the New Hampshire House of Representatives.

Life and career 
Sellers served in the United States Air Force.

In September 2022, Sellers defeated Andrew Ware in the Republican primary election for the Grafton 18th district of the New Hampshire House of Representatives. In November 2022, he defeated Carolyn Fluehr-Lobban in the general election, winning 50 percent of the votes. He assumed office in December 2022.

References 

Living people
Year of birth missing (living people)
Place of birth missing (living people)
Republican Party members of the New Hampshire House of Representatives
21st-century American politicians